Deh-e Zu ol Faqar (also Romanized as  Deh-e Z̄ū ol Faqār, Deh-e Z̄owlfaqār, Deh Z̄owifaqār, Deh Z̄owlfaqār, and Deh Zulfiqār) is a village in Zalian Rural District, Zalian District, Shazand County, Markazi Province, Iran. At the 2006 census, its population was 76, in 19 families.

References 

Populated places in Shazand County